Mednafen (My Emulator Doesn't Need A Frickin' Excellent Name), formerly known as Nintencer, is an OpenGL and SDL multi-system free software wrapper that bundles various original and third-party emulation cores into a single package, and is driven by command-line input. It is distributed under the terms of the GPL-2.0-or-later license. Certain emulation cores of Mednafen have been ported to RetroArch/Libretro.

RetroArch's fork Beetle-PSX supports additional features, including hardware rendering (Vulkan and OpenGL), higher internal resolution, anti-aliasing, texture filtering, texture replacement, post-processing shaders, GTE subpixel precision and perspective-correct texture mapping.

The emulator runs under Microsoft Windows, Linux, OpenBSD, PlayStation 3, RISC OS, and Wii.

Supported systems

Front-ends 

There are a number of open-source graphical front-ends for Mednafen actively being developed.

See also 
 List of video game console emulators
 Computer system

References

External links 

 

Free video game console emulators
Free software programmed in C++
Free software that uses SDL
Game Boy Advance emulators
Game Boy emulators
Linux emulation software
MacOS emulation software
Multi-emulators
Nintendo Entertainment System emulators
Software that uses GTK
Software using the GPL license
TurboGrafx-16 emulators